This article lists the results for the sport of Squash in 2017.

2016–17 PSA World Series

 August 23 – 28: 2016 Hong Kong Open for Men and Women in 
 Men:  Ramy Ashour defeated  Karim Abdel Gawad, 11–9, 8–11, 11–6, 5–11, 11–6, to win his third Hong Kong Open title.
 Women:  Nouran Gohar defeated  Amanda Sobhy, 6–11, 12-10, 11–7, 11–8, to win her first Hong Kong Open title.
 October 6 – 15: 2016 US Open for Men and Women in  Philadelphia
 Men:  Mohamed El Shorbagy defeated  Nick Matthew, 10–12, 12–14, 11–1, 11–4, 3–0 (Retired), to win his second US Open title.
 Women:  Camille Serme defeated  Nour El Sherbini, 11–8, 7–11, 12–10, 11–9, to win her first US Open title. 
 November 13 – 18: 2016 Qatar Classic in  Doha
  Karim Abdel Gawad defeated fellow Egyptian, Mohamed El Shorbagy, 12–10, 15–13, 11–7, to win his first Qatar Classic title.
 January 12 – 19: 2017 Tournament of Champions for Men and Women in  New York City
 Men:  Karim Abdel Gawad defeated  Grégory Gaultier, 6–11, 11–6, 12–10, 11–6, to win his first Tournament of Champions title.
 Women:  Camille Serme defeated  Laura Massaro, 13–11, 8–11, 4–11, 11–3, 11–7, to win her first Tournament of Champions title.
 February 23 – March 1: Windy City Open for Men and Women in  Chicago
 Men:  Grégory Gaultier defeated  Marwan El Shorbagy, 5–11, 11–8, 11–2, 11–4, to win his second Windy City Open title.
 Women:  Raneem El Weleily defeated fellow Egyptian, Nour El Sherbini, 10–12, 11–7, 11–7, 11–7, to win her third consecutive Windy City Open title.
 March 20 – 26: British Open for Men and Women in  Hull
 Men:  Grégory Gaultier defeated  Nick Matthew, 8-11, 11-7, 11-3, 11-3, to win his third British Open title.
 Women:  Laura Massaro defeated fellow English woman, Sarah-Jane Perry, 11-8, 11-8, 6-11, 11-6, to win her second British Open title.
 April 9 – 14: El Gouna International in  El Gouna
  Grégory Gaultier defeated  Karim Abdel Gawad, 11-6, 11-8, 11-7, to win his first El Gouna International title.
 June 6 – 10: PSA World Series Finals in  Dubai
 Men:  Mohamed El Shorbagy defeated  James Willstrop, 12–10, 11–9, 11–8, to win his first Men's PSA World Series Finals title.
 Women:  Laura Massaro defeated  Nour El Sherbini, 11–8, 12–10, 11–5, to win her second consecutive Women's PSA World Series Finals title.

World squash championships
 April 7 – 14: 2016 Women's World Open Squash Championship in  El Gouna
  Nour El Sherbini defeated fellow Egyptian, Raneem El Weleily, 11–8, 11–9, 11–9, to win her second consecutive Women's World Open Squash Championship title.
 July 19 – 24: 2017 World Junior Squash Championships in  Tauranga
 Men:  Marwan Tarek defeated  Victor Crouin, 11–9, 3–11, 11–6, 3–11, 11–2, to win his first World Junior Squash Championships title.
 Women:  Rowan Reda Araby defeated fellow Egyptian, Hania El Hammamy, 11–7, 11–9, 11–8, to win her first World Junior Squash Championships title.
 July 25 – 29: 2017 Women's World Junior Team Championship in  Tauranga
  defeated , 2–0 in matches played, to win their sixth consecutive and eighth overall Women's World Junior Team Championship title.
 August 1 – 5: 2017 World Doubles Squash Championships in  Manchester
 Men:  (Ryan Cuskelly & Cameron Pilley) defeated  (Alan Clyne & Greg Lobban), 11–6 & 11–3, in the final.
 Women:  (Joelle King & Amanda Landers-Murphy) defeated  (Jenny Duncalf & Alison Waters), 9–11, 11–1, & 11–10, in the final.
 Mixed:  (Joelle King & Paul Coll) defeated  (Alison Waters & Daryl Selby), 11–8, 9–11, & 11–6, in the final.
 September 21 – 24: 2017 World Hardball Doubles Squash Championships in  St. Louis
 Men:  (Clive Leach & John Russell) defeated  (Thomas Brinkman & Robin Clarke), 15–10, 15–10, 3–15, 7–15, 15–14, in the final.
 Women:  (Suzie Pierrepont & Georgina Stoker) defeated  (Narelle Krizek & Natarsha McElhinny), 12–15, 15–11, 15–3, 15–7, in the final.
 November 27 – December 3: 2017 Men's World Team Squash Championships in  Marseille
  defeated , 11–9, 11–3, 11–7 & 11–5, 11–9, 11–5, to win their fourth Men's World Team Squash Championships title.
 December 10 – 17: 2017 World Squash Championships in  Manchester
 Men:  Mohamed El Shorbagy defeated fellow Egyptian, Marwan El Shorbagy, 11–5, 9–11, 11–7, 9–11, 11–6, to win his first World Squash Championships title.
 Women:  Raneem El Weleily defeated fellow Egyptian, Nour El Sherbini, 3–11, 12–10, 11–7, 11–5, to win her first World Squash Championships title.

Other squash events
 February 1 – 5: 18th Asian Junior Squash Team Championships in 
 Boys:  defeated , 2–0.  took third place.
 Girls:  Malaysia defeated  Hong Kong, 2–0.  Japan took third place.
 February 6 – 11: South American Junior Squash Championship in  Asunción
 U11 winners:  Juan Antonio Irisarri (m) /  Tabita Gaitán (f)
 U13 winners:  Javier Romo (m) /  María Emilia Falconí (f)
 U15 winners:  David Costales (m) /  María Caridad Buenaño (f)
 U17 winners:  Rafael Gálvez (m) /  María Paula Moya (f)
 U19 winners:  Ronald Palomino (m) /  María Paula Tovar (f)
 Doubles:  Alejandro Enríquez &  Ricardo Toscano (m) /  Sophia Giraldo &  María Paula Tovar (f)
 Mixed:  Francesco Marcantonio &  Luján Palacios
 March 10 – 12: 2nd Balkan Junior & 1st Individual Championships in  Belgrade
 Winners:  Martin Mosnik (m) /  Paulina Radoš (f)
 Juniors winners:  Ivan Krznaric (m) /  Zaynep Kabakçi (f)
 April 4 – 7: European Team Championships Div 3 in  Saint Helier
 Men's:  defeated , 3–0.  took third place.
 Women's: Round Robin: 1st.  Malta; 2nd.  Russia; 3rd.  Jersey
 April 8 – 16: European Junior U19 Individual & Team Championships in  Lisbon
 Individual men's winners: 1.  Victor Crouin; 2.  Kyle Finch; 3.  Roman Allinckx
 Individual women's winners: 1.  Cristina Gomez; 2.  Elise Lazarus;  Lucy Turmel
 Teams winners: 1. ; 2.  3. 
 April 14 – 17: Oceania Junior Championships in  Auckland
 U11 winners:  Matthew Growcott (b) /  Maia Smales (g)
 U13 winners:  Edward Boon Hwi Thng (b) /  Natalie Sayes (g)
 U15 winners:  Leo Fatialofa (b) /  Sze Yu Lee (g)
 U17 winners:  Matthew Lucente (b) /  Rhiarne Taiapa (g)
 U19 winners:  Finn Trimble (b) /  Kaitlyn Watts (g)
 April 26 – 29: European Team Championship Div. 1 & 2 in  Helsinki
 Men's Division 1:  defeated , 3–0.  and  took third and fourth places.
 Men's Division 2:  defeated , 2–1.  and  took third and fourth places.
 Women's Division 1:  England defeated  France, 2–0.  Wales and  Netherlands took third and fourth places.
 Women's Division 2:  Germany defeated  Switzerland, 2–0.  Scotland and  Austria took third and fourth places.
 April 26 – 30: 2017 Asian Individual Squash Championships for Men's and Women's in  Chennai
 Men's: In the final,  Max Lee defeated  Saurav Ghosal, 3–1 (5–11, 11–4, 11–8, 11–7).
 Women's: In the final,  Joshana Chinappa defeated  Dipika Pallikal, 3–2 (13–15, 12–10, 11–13, 11–4, 11–4).
 May 11 – 14: European Junior U15/U17 Team Championships in  Prague
 U15 winners: 
 U17 winners: 
TBD for May: South American Championship in  Buenos Aires
 August 15 – 19: 2017 Asian Junior Squash Individual Championships in  Amman
 U13 winners:  Joachim Chuah Han Wen (b) /  Aira Azman (g)
 U15 winners:  Muhammad Amir Amirul Bin Azhar (b) /  Jessica Keng Jiai Hui (g)
 U17 winners:  Siow Yee Xian (b) /  Chan Sin Yuk (g)
 U19 winners:  Mohammad Al-Sarraj (b) /  Satomi Watanabe (g)
 August 30 – September 2: European Masters Individual Championships in  Wrocław
 +35 winners:  Heiko Schwarzer (m) /  Lauren Briggs (f)
 +40 winners:  Christian Drakenberg (m) /  Keeley Johnson (f)
 +45 winners:  Christian Borgvall (m) /  Simone Korell (f)
 +50 winners:  Fredrik Johnson (m) /  Mylene de Muylder (f)
 +55 winners:  Mark Woodliffe (m) /  Fiona McLean (f)
 +60 winners:  Mark Cowley (m) /  Julie Field (f)
 +65 winners:  John Rae (Men's only)
 +70 winners:  Ian Ross (m) /  Ann Manley (f)
 +75 winners:  Bertil Walli (Men's only)
 September 13 – 16: European Club Championships in  Paderborn
 September 16 – 22: Oceania Team Championships and Oceania Individual Championships in  Papeete
 September 22 – 24: 8th Balkan Team Championships in  Zagreb

References

External links
 World Squash: official website of the World Squash Federation

 
Squash by year